Six Run Creek is a tributary of the Black River, that is  long, in southeastern North Carolina in the United States.

Variant names
According to the Geographic Names Information System, it has also been known historically as:  
Six Runs Creek

See also
List of North Carolina rivers

References

Rivers of North Carolina
Rivers of Sampson County, North Carolina